The Devil Wives of Li Fong is a novel by E. Hoffmann Price published in 1979.

Plot summary
The Devil Wives of Li Fong is a novel that takes place in long ago China as a land of myth and legend.

Reception
Greg Costikyan reviewed The Devil Wives of Li Fong in Ares Magazine #2 and commented that "Price is a skilled craftsman. Even if he isn't the next Dostoyevsky, his Devil Wives is still much better than ninety percent of the dreck that's being marketed as fantasy these days."

Reviews
Review by Don Herron (1980) in Paragon, #1 May 1980
Review by Tom Staicar (1980) in Fantastic, July 1980
Review by Lin Carter (1980) in The Year's Best Fantasy Stories: 6
Review by Mark Mansell (1980) in Science Fiction Review, Winter 1980
Review by W. Paul Ganley (1984) in Fantasy Mongers, #10 Spring 1984

References

1979 American novels
Novels set in China